Ricard Fernández Betriu (born 19 March 1999), also known as Cucu, is an Andorran footballer who plays for SD Formentera.

International career
Fernández made his senior debut for the Andorra national football team in a 1–0 friendly win over Liechtenstein on 21 March 2018. He has remained in the under-21 set up since, however, notably scoring a brace in a shock 3-3 draw with England in October 2020, securing Andorra under-21s a rare point against a team featuring Premier League players such as Eddie Nketiah and Aaron Ramsdale. On 12 November 2021, he received a red card for elbowing Kamil Glik in the first minute of the match vs Poland, which Andorra went on to lose by a score of 1–4.

International goals

References

External links
 Soccerway Profile
 NFT Profile
 La Preferente Profile

1999 births
Living people
People from Andorra la Vella
Andorran footballers
Andorran expatriate footballers
Andorra international footballers
Segunda División B players
Tercera División players
FC Andorra players
SD Formentera players
Association football forwards
Andorran expatriate sportspeople in Spain
Expatriate footballers in Spain